Raynham is a town in Bristol County, Massachusetts, United States, located approximately  south of Boston and  northeast of Providence, Rhode Island.  The population was 15,082 at the 2020 census. It has one village, Raynham Center.

History
The area that is now Raynham was settled in 1639 as a part of Taunton, and was founded by Elizabeth Pole, the first woman to found a town in America.

It was to that area three years earlier that Roger Williams, proponent of separation of church and state, of paying Indians for land acquired and abolishing slavery, had escaped, traveling 55 miles during a January blizzard.  He was fleeing a conviction for sedition and heresy of the General Court of Salem, and it was here that the local Wampanoags offered him shelter at their winter camp. Their Sachem Massasoit hosted Williams for the three months until spring.

In 1652, bog iron was found along the Two Mile (Forge) River. Soon after, the Taunton Iron Works was established by residents James and Henry Leonard. It was the first successful iron works established in what was then Plymouth Colony, and operated from 1656 to 1876. It was not the "First Iron Works in America", as proclaimed on the Town's official seal, having been predated by the Saugus and Braintree iron works. The success of the Taunton Iron Works, however, led to the establishment of other iron works throughout the colonies.

Raynham played a key part in King Philip's War. The Leonards had forged a friendship before the war began with King Philip, who lived in the area. It is said that Philip agreed to spare the town from the mass destruction if the Leonards repaired his troops' weapons in their iron forge.

The eastern end of Taunton was separated from that town and incorporated as Raynham on April 2, 1731, named after the English village of Raynham in the county of Norfolk, England.  Many ships' hulls were built along the Taunton River in Raynham, which were sailed down the river towards Fall River and Narragansett Bay for final fittings.  The town also had other small manufacturing industries, but for the most part it was known for its rural and agrarian base.

Transportation
The intersection of Interstate 495 and Massachusetts Route 24, a four-lane divided highway, is located at the town's border with Bridgewater.  Additionally, U.S. Route 44, Massachusetts Route 104 and Route 138 pass through the town.  Route 24 has one exit which gives access to the town, Exit 13 (Route 44), and there is also a Raynham exit on Interstate 495, Exit 8 (Route 138).

Raynham is one of the towns covered by the Greater Attleboro Taunton Regional Transit Authority (GATRA) bus service. The MBTA Commuter Rail's nearest stop is in neighboring Bridgewater, on the Middleborough/Lakeville Line. The second phase of the MBTA's South Coast Rail project is proposed to extend the existing Stoughton Line south through Easton and Raynham to Fall River and New Bedford. The line would make a station stop at the proposed Raynham Place Station, which would be located next to Raynham Park.

The nearest local airport is in Taunton; commercial air service exists at Logan International Airport in Boston and at T. F. Green Airport in Providence, Rhode Island.

Demographics

As of the census of 2000, there were 11,739 people, 4,143 households, and 3,231 families residing in the town. The racial makeup of the town was 96.54% White, 1.04% African American, 0.06% Native American, 0.69% Asian, 0.03% Pacific Islander, 0.71% from other races, and 0.94% from two or more races. Hispanic or Latino of any race were 0.83% of the population.

There were 4,143 households, out of which 36.7% had children under the age of 18 living with them, 63.8% were married couples living together, 10.6% had a female householder with no husband present, and 22.0% were non-families. Of all households 17.9% were made up of individuals, and 8.5% had someone living alone who was 65 years of age or older.  The average household size was 2.80 and the average family size was 3.18.

In the town, the population was spread out, with 25.7% under the age of 18, 6.8% from 18 to 24, 29.9% from 25 to 44, 24.7% from 45 to 64, and 13.0% who were 65 years of age or older.  The median age was 38 years. For every 100 females, there were 91.8 males.  For every 100 females age 18 and over, there were 88.5 males.

The median income for a household in the town was $60,449, and the median income for a family was $68,354. Males had a median income of $46,954 versus $31,760 for females. The per capita income for the town was $24,476.  About 3.2% of families and 4.1% of the population were below the poverty line, including 3.7% of those under age 18 and 9.0% of those age 65 or over.

Government
The town is part of the Eighth Plymouth state representative district, which includes Bridgewater and part of Easton.  It is also part of the First Plymouth and Bristol state senate district, which includes Berkley, Bridgewater, Carver, Dighton, Marion, Middleborough, Taunton and Wareham.  Raynham is patrolled by Troop D (Southeast District), 4th Barracks (located in Middleborough) of the Massachusetts State Police.  On the national level, the town is part of Massachusetts Congressional District 4, which is represented by Jake Auchincloss.  The state's senior (Class I) Senator is Elizabeth Warren, and the state's junior (Class II) Senator is Ed Markey.

Raynham is governed by an open town meeting and elects a board of selectmen, which directs a full-time town administrator. Marie Smith, Joseph Pacheco and Karen Donahue are the town elected selectmen.  The acting Town Administrator is David Flaherty.  The three members of the board of selectmen are elected at large on a staggered schedule. Basic services are centered around the town hall located at Raynham Center, including the police station and fire department.  There are two post offices, located near Raynham Center and along Route 138 near North Raynham.  The town also operates the Borden Colony Recreation Area, and there is a small State Forest in the town.

Education

Raynham belongs to the Bridgewater-Raynham Regional School District.  There are three schools in Raynham: L.B. Merrill Elementary School, housing Pre-Kindergarten through 1st Grade, LaLiberte Elementary School, housing 2nd through 4th grades, and Raynham Middle School, housing 5th through 8th grades. Bridgewater-Raynham Regional High School, located in Bridgewater, houses 9th through 12th grades.  The high school athletics teams are nicknamed the Trojans, and the primary colors are red and white, with blue trim.  The BR School District Chairman is Ronald Pacy and the school committee consists of eight members.  High school students may also attend Bristol-Plymouth Regional Technical School, located in Taunton, or Bristol County Agricultural High School in Dighton.  Students may also select to attend private and parochial schools in the neighboring towns.

In recent years, discussions have taken place regarding the possibility of the withdrawal of Raynham's three pre-kindergarten-eighth grade schools from the Bridgewater-Raynham Regional School District. The town cites an unfair funding formula, as well as Bridgewater's inability to fully fund the district, as its reasons for the proposal. However, on November 17, 2010, the proposal was unanimously defeated by voters at a special town meeting, thereby maintaining the current regional system.

Recreation

Raynham Park is located in Raynham and holds the world record for largest annual handle. All racing at the park was formally ended on January 1, 2010 after the state election banned all greyhound racing. The building remains to host simulcast racing.  In 2011 the Wampanoag Indian tribe indicated an interest in establishing a "Racino"-style gaming casino at the Raynham dog track., but in August 2011 talks broke down. Also the youth baseball "RYBSA" and soccer programs are considered to be some of the better programs around.

Religion

Raynham is host to several religious organizations of various religious denominations. Among the largest is St. Ann's Roman Catholic Church, First Baptist Church on Church Street (Which is home to the Raynham Food Basket), Calvary Chapel contemporary evangelical church, Lutheran Church of the Way, First Congregational Stone Church, and Father's House Family Protestant Church. Raynham is also home to Wat Nawamintararachutis, opened in 2014 as the largest Thai Buddhist temple in the world outside of Thailand. Raynham is also home to a sizeable Jewish community.

Notable people

 Frederick C. Anderson, received the United States military's highest decoration for valor, the Medal of Honor, for his action of capturing the battle flag of the 27th South Carolina regiment at the battle of Wheldon Railroad (also known as the Battle of Globe Tavern) near Petersburg, Virginia on September 6, 1864.  Anderson was a member of the 18th Massachusetts Volunteer Regiment which was eventually transferred into the 32nd Regiment Massachusetts Volunteer Infantry which saw action in many of the major battles of the eastern campaign of the Civil War, including  Antietam, MD, Shephardstown, VA, the Second Battle of Bull Run near Manassas, VA, Fredericksburg, VA, Chancellorsville, VA, Gettysburg, PA, Rapahannock Station, VA, the Wilderness campaign, VA, Cold Harbor, VA, Petersburg, VA, and Appomattox, VA. During the Civil War, battle flags served as rallying points, as well as for identification and communication, and it was considered a great honor to carry or capture them, even though the flags were a focal points for enemy fire and the mortality rate was high for such individuals
 Toby Gilmore, a former slave, volunteered in 1776 to serve in the Continental Army in place of his master who had been drafted. He served under General George Washington as tent master and is believed to have crossed the Delaware with him and spent the winter at Valley Forge
 Jared C. Monti, received the United States military's highest decoration for valor, the Medal of Honor, for his actions in Afghanistan attempting to rescue a wounded American soldier while under fire from enemy insurgents. Monti was killed in action in 2006 during this third attempt to rescue SPC Brian J. Bradbury. His actions are memorialized in the book "See You on the High Ground" written by Len Sandler, childhood friend of Monti's father. Also, the story of his father Paul C. Monti driving in Jared's truck after his death has been memorialized in the 2012 Country Western song "I Drive Your Truck" by Lee Brice. The song won The Academy of Country Music and The Country Music Association awards for Song of the Year.
 Gil Santos, the longtime radio play-by-play announcer for the New England Patriots of the National Football League

See also
 Greater Taunton Area
 Taunton River
 Taunton River Watershed

References

External links

 Town of Raynham official website
 Bridgewater-Raynham Regional School District
 Answer Book/Raynham: "Everything you need to know"

 
Greater Taunton Area
Providence metropolitan area
Towns in Bristol County, Massachusetts
Towns in Massachusetts